Miracle Child may refer to:

 Miracle Child (film), a 1993 American television film
 Miracle child (infant), a baby born before 37 weeks of gestation
 Miracle child (master), someone who at an early age masters one or more skills at an adult level
 Miracle child (pretender) (1820–1883), Duke of Bordeaux
 Miracle child (saint) (1966–1967), Argentine folk saint
 "Miracle Child" (song), a 1989 progressive rock song
 The Miracle Child, a 1932 French science fiction film
 The Miracle Child: He Giveth and Taketh, a 1922 American Western film

See also

 The Miracle Kid